Japan competed at the 2015 World Aquatics Championships in Kazan, Russia from 24 July to 9 August 2015.

Medalists

Diving

Japanese divers qualified for the individual spots and the synchronized teams at the World Championships.

Men

Women

Mixed

Open water swimming

Japan has fielded a team of four swimmers to compete in the open water marathon. Among the official roster are 2012 Olympians Yasunari Hirai and Yumi Kida.

Swimming

Japanese swimmers have achieved qualifying standards in the following events (up to a maximum of 2 swimmers in each event at the A-standard entry time, and 1 at the B-standard): Swimmers must qualify at the 2015 Japanese Championships (for pool events) to confirm their places at the Worlds.

Twenty-four swimmers have been officially nominated to the Japanese team to compete in the Worlds, including defending champion Daiya Seto in the 400 m individual medley and Olympic medalists Ryosuke Irie, Ryo Tateishi, and Natsumi Hoshi. Japan's rising superstar Kosuke Hagino was set to compete, but later withdrew from the team due to elbow fracture.

Men

Women

Mixed

Synchronized swimming

Japan fielded a full squad of twelve synchronized swimmers (one male and eleven female) to compete in each of the following events.

Women

Mixed

Water polo

Men's tournament

Team roster

Katsuyuki Tanamura
Seiya Adachi
Atsushi Arai
Mitsuaki Shiga
Akira Yanase
Atsuto Iida
Yusuke Shimizu
Yuki Kadono
Koji Takei
Kenya Yasuda
Keigo Okawa
Shota Hazui
Tomoyoshi Fukushima

Group play

13th–16th place semifinals

13th place game

Women's tournament

Team roster

Rikako Miura
Chiaki Sakanoue
Yuri Kazama
Shino Magariyama
Moe Nakata
Ayaka Takahashi
Yumi Nakano
Mitsuki Hashiguchi
Kana Hosoya
Tsubasa Mori
Marina Tokumoto
Kotori Suzuki
Yuko Umeda

Group play

13th–16th place semifinals

15th place game

References

External links
 

Nations at the 2015 World Aquatics Championships
2015 in Japanese sport
Japan at the World Aquatics Championships